Gillian Bouras (born 1945) is an expatriate Australian writer who has written several books, short stories and articles, many of these dealing with her experiences as an Australian woman in Greece.

Life
Gillian Bouras was born in Melbourne in 1945. Both her parents and her grandfather were school teachers. Her childhood was spent moving in several towns in Australia Victoria, including Nhill and Beechworth, and Melbourne.

Gillian Bouras studied for her Bachelor of Arts at the University of Melbourne, and from 1967 to 1980 she worked as a secondary school teacher of English. In 1981 Mrs Bouras completed her Master of Education thesis at the same university on the life of her grandfather: School teacher in Victoria: The biography of Arthur John Hicks.

She married George Bouras, a Greek emigrant to Australia, in 1969. In 1980 Gillian went with her husband and her two sons to the Peloponnese area of Greece, initially for a six-month holiday, but the family stayed. She had her third son in Greece, and eventually became a Greek citizen.

In 1996, her younger sister Jacqui committed suicide, after decades of mental illness. Bouras' book, No Time for Dances, explores her sister's life in an attempt to understand her suicide. Gillian Bouras wrote: "I keep trying to close a mental door, or to put a very firm lid on these questions, for there are no answers, and writing them down is one way of attempting closure."

Gillian Bouras now lives in the Peloponnese, Greece, but she maintains her ties with Australia.

Career
Bouras published her first book, the autobiographical A Foreign Wife, in 1986. It describes her life as a foreign wife in Greece, and the challenges she faced in living in Greek culture and society. Most of the works she has published since then, both autobiographical and fiction, explore the themes of exile, cultural identity, and family.

Gillian Bouras also published short stories and articles in newspapers and journals such as The Griffith Review, Meanjin and Island. She has presented papers at conferences and participated in literary events, in Australia and abroad.

Since approximately 2000, Gillian Bouras prepared discussion notes for the book group program managed by the Australian Council of Adult Education (CAE).

Awards and nominations
1994: Aphrodite and the Others: Ethnic Affairs Commission Award in the New South Wales Premier's Literary Awards
2007: No Time for Dances: Shortlisted for the National Biography Award

Works

Non-fiction
A Foreign Wife (1986)
A Fair Exchange (1991)
Aphrodite and the Others (1994)
Starting Again (1999)
No Time for Dances: A Memoir of my Sister (2006)

Adult fiction
A Stranger Here (1996)

Children's fiction
Saving Christmas (2000)
Aphrodite Alexandra (2007)

Notes

External links
"Gillian Bouras: A Sister's Story", on ABC Radio National Life Matters, 2006-05-18 Accessed: 2007-11-12
Gillian Bouras Website Accessed 2010-03-12

References
Bouras, Gillian (c.2003) Submission No. 179 to the Senate Inquiry into Australian Expatriates Accessed: 2007-11-12
Bouras, Gillian (2006) No Time for Dances: A Memoir of My Sister, Camberwell, Penguin
Good Reading Magazine News Archive, 2007-03-19 Accessed: 2007-11-12
National Library of Australia, Papers of Gillian Bouras, Ms7993 Accessed: 2007-11-12
Wilde, William H., Hooton, Joy and Andrews, Barry (1994) The Oxford Companion to Australian Literature 2nd ed., Melbourne, Oxford University Press

1945 births
Australian women novelists
Australian memoirists
Australian women short story writers
Australian children's writers
Australian expatriates in Greece
Living people
20th-century Australian novelists
Writers from Melbourne
Australian women memoirists
Australian women children's writers
20th-century Australian women
University of Melbourne alumni
20th-century Australian short story writers
21st-century Australian short story writers
21st-century Australian women writers
University of Melbourne women